Veľopolie is a village and municipality in Humenné District in the Prešov Region of north-east Slovakia.

History
In historical records the village was first mentioned in 1620.

Geography
The municipality lies at an altitude of 185 metres and covers an area of 7.865 km2.
It has a population of about 320 people.

External links
 
 https://web.archive.org/web/20080111223415/http://www.statistics.sk/mosmis/eng/run.html 

Villages and municipalities in Humenné District